The 1998 All-SEC football team consists of American football players selected to the All-Southeastern Conference (SEC) chosen by the Associated Press (AP) and the conference coaches for the 1998 NCAA Division I-A football season.

The Tennessee Volunteers won the conference, beating the Mississippi State Bulldogs 24 to 14 in the SEC Championship game. The Volunteers then won the National Championship game over the Florida State Seminoles 23 to 16.

Kentucky quarterback Tim Couch was voted the AP SEC Offensive Player of the Year. Florida linebacker Jevon Kearse was voted AP SEC Defensive Player of the Year.

Offensive selections

Quarterbacks
Tim Couch†, Kentucky (AP-1, Coaches-1)
Clint Stoerner, Arkansas (AP-2)

Running backs
Kevin Faulk, LSU (AP-1, Coaches-1)
James Johnson, Miss. St. (AP-1)
Shaun Alexander, Alabama (AP-2)
Deuce McAllister, Ole Miss (AP-2)

Wide receivers
Travis McGriff, Florida (AP-1)
Craig Yeast, Kentucky (AP-1)
Anthony Lucas, Arkansas (AP-2)
Peerless Price, Tennessee (AP-2)

Centers
Todd McClure, LSU (AP-1, Coaches-1)
Eric Allen, Miss. St. (AP-2)

Guards
Brandon Burlsworth, Arkansas (AP-1)
Cosey Coleman, Tennessee (AP-1)
Randy Thomas, Miss. St. (AP-2)

Tackles
Matt Stinchcomb, Georgia (AP-1, Coaches-1)
Kris Comstock, Kentucky (AP-1)
Zach Piller, Florida (AP-2)
Chad Clifton, Tennessee (AP-2)

Tight ends
 Rufus French, Ole Miss (AP-1, Coaches-1)
 Reggie Kelly, Mississippi State (AP-1)
Larry Brown, Georgia  (AP-2)

Defensive selections

Defensive ends
Edward Smith, Miss. St. (AP-1)
Leonardo Carson, Auburn (AP-1)
Kenny Smith, Alabama (AP-2)
Willie Cohens, Florida (AP-2)
Antonio Cochrane, Georgia (AP-2)
C. J. McLain, Arkansas (AP-2)

Defensive tackles 
Anthony McFarland, LSU (AP-1)
Reggie McGrew, Florida (AP-1)
Darwin Walker, Tennessee (AP-1)
Melvin Bradley, Arkansas (AP-2)
Charles Dorsey, Auburn (AP-2)
Ed Chester, Florida (AP-2)

Linebackers
Al Wilson†, Tennessee (AP-1, Coaches-1)
Jevon Kearse, Florida (AP-1, Coaches-1)
Raynoch Thompson, Tennessee (AP-1)
Mike Peterson, Florida (AP-2)
Johnny Rutledge, Florida (AP-2)
Jamie Winborn, Vanderbilt (AP-2)
Armegis Spearman, Ole Miss (AP-2)

Cornerbacks
Champ Bailey*, Georgia (AP-1, Coaches-1)
Tony George, Florida (AP-1)
Fernando Bryant, Alabama (AP-1)
Jimmy Williams, Vanderbilt (AP-2)
Dwayne Goodrich, Tennessee (AP-2)

Safeties 
Zac Painter, Arkansas (AP-1)
Kirby Smart, Georgia (AP-1)
Teako Brown, Florida (AP-2)
Kenoy Kennedy, Arkansas (AP-2)
 Rob Pate, Auburn (Coaches-2)

Special teams

Kickers
Jeff Hall, Tennessee (AP-1)
Todd Latourette, Arkansas (AP-2)

Punters
Daniel Pope, Alabama (AP-1)
Jeff Walker, Miss. St. (AP-2)

All purpose/return specialist
Craig Yeast, Kentucky (AP-1)
Kevin Prentiss, Miss. St. (AP-2)

Key
*Bold: Consensus first-team selection by both the coaches and AP
AP: Associated Press
Coaches: selected by the SEC coaches
*Unanimous selection of AP
†Unanimous selection of both AP and Coaches

See also
1998 College Football All-America Team

References

All-Southeastern Conference
All-SEC football teams